Joe Kiser is an American rock musician who has been in four bands: Exitsect, Murder-Suicide Pact, Slap of Reality and Paineater.

References

Year of birth missing (living people)
Living people
American punk rock guitarists
American heavy metal guitarists